Matun may refer to:
Khost (Matun) District, Afghanistan
Matun, Zaoqiang County (马屯镇), town in Zaoqiang County, Hebei, China
Matun, Mengjin County (麻屯镇), town in Mengjin County, Henan, China
Matun, Cuba